Alva Erskine Belmont (née Smith; January 17, 1853 – January 26, 1933), known as Alva Vanderbilt from 1875 to 1896, was an American multi-millionaire socialite and  women's suffrage activist. She was noted for her energy, intelligence, strong opinions, and willingness to challenge convention.

In 1909, she founded the Political Equality League to get votes for suffrage-supporting New York State politicians, wrote articles for newspapers, and joined the National American Woman Suffrage Association (NAWSA). She later formed her own Political Equality League to seek broad support for suffrage in neighborhoods throughout New York City, and, as its president, led its division of New York City's 1912 Women's Votes Parade. In 1916, she was one of the founders of the National Woman's Party (NWP) and organized the first picketing ever to take place before the White House, in January 1917. She was elected president of the NWP, an office she held until her death.

She was married twice, to socially prominent New York City millionaires William Kissam Vanderbilt, with whom she had three children, and Oliver Hazard Perry Belmont.  Alva was known for her many building projects, including: the Petit Chateau in New York; the Marble House in Newport, Rhode Island; the Belmont House in New York; Brookholt in Long Island; and Beacon Towers in Sands Point, New York.

On "Equal Pay Day," April 12, 2016, Belmont was honored when President Barack Obama established the Belmont-Paul Women's Equality National Monument in Washington, D.C.

Early life

Smith was the son of George Smith and Delia Forbes of Dumfries, Virginia. Phoebe Desha was the daughter of US Representative Robert Desha and Eleanor Shelby, both originally from Sumner County, Tennessee.

Alva was one of six children. Two of her sisters, Alice and Eleanor, both died as children before she was born.  Her brother, Murray Forbes Smith, Jr. died in 1857 and was buried in Magnolia Cemetery in Mobile.  Two other sisters, Armide Vogel Smith and Mary Virginia "Jennie" Smith, were her only siblings to survive into adulthood.  Jennie first married Fernando Yznaga, the brother of Alva's childhood best friend, Consuelo Yznaga, Duchess of Manchester. Following a divorce from Fernando in 1886, Jennie remarried, to William George Tiffany.

As a child, Alva summered with her parents in Newport, Rhode Island, and accompanied them on European vacations.  In 1859, the Smiths left Mobile and relocated to New York City, where they briefly settled in Madison Square.  When Murray went to Liverpool, England, to conduct his business, her mother, Phoebe Smith, moved to Paris where Alva attended a private boarding school in Neuilly-sur-Seine.  After the Civil War, the Smith family returned to New York, where Phoebe died in 1871.

Personal life

At a party for one of William Henry Vanderbilt's daughters, Smith's best friend, Consuelo Yznaga introduced her to William Kissam Vanderbilt, grandson of Cornelius Vanderbilt.  On April 20, 1875, William and Alva were married at Calvary Church in New York City.

The couple had three children:

 Consuelo Vanderbilt (March 2, 1877 – December 6, 1964)
 William Kissam Vanderbilt II (October 26, 1878 – January 8, 1944)
 Harold Stirling Vanderbilt (July 6, 1884 – July 4, 1970)

Alva maneuvered Consuelo into marrying Charles Spencer-Churchill, 9th Duke of Marlborough, on November 6, 1895.  The marriage was annulled much later, at the Duke's request and Consuelo's assent, in May 1921.  The annulment was fully supported by Alva, who testified that she had forced Consuelo into the marriage.  By this time Consuelo and her mother enjoyed a closer, easier relationship. Consuelo married Jacques Balsan, a French aeronautics pioneer. William Kissam II became president of the New York Central Railroad Company on his father's death in 1920. Harold Stirling graduated from Harvard Law School in 1910, then joined his father at the New York Central Railroad Company. He remained the only active representative of the Vanderbilt family in the New York Central Railroad after his brother's death, serving as a director and member of the executive committee until 1954.

Rise in society

Balls and dances, the Fifth Avenue chateau

Determined to bring the Vanderbilt family the social status that she felt it deserved, Vanderbilt christened the Fifth Avenue chateau—placed between 5th Avenue and 52nd Street, occupying a city block—in March 1883 with a masquerade ball for 1000 guests. "The New York World speculated that Alva’s party cost [at least] more than a quarter of a million dollars, more than $5 million in today’s dollars," wrote Roark et al in 2020. 

An oft-repeated story tells that Vanderbilt felt she had been snubbed by Caroline Astor, queen of "The 400" elite of New York society, so she purposely neglected to send an invitation to her housewarming ball, a dress ball of about 750 guests, to Astor's popular daughter, Carrie. Supposedly, this forced Astor to come calling, in order to secure an invitation to the ball for her daughter. 

Astor did in fact pay a social call on Vanderbilt and she and her daughter were guests at the ball, effectively giving the Vanderbilt family society's official acceptance (Vanderbilt and Astor were observed at the ball in animated conversation). "We have no right to exclude those whom this great country has brought forward," Astor conceded, "The time has come for the Vanderbilts." 

Triumphant, Alva dressed as a venetian noble to the ball, but her sister-in-law Alice outdid her, in a costume highlighting a then brand-new invention: the electric light. Her white satin evening dress, since named the Electric Light dress, was studded with glass beads in a lightning bolt pattern and caused a stir in the press.

The chief effect of the ball was to raise the bar on society entertainments in New York to heights of extravagance and expense that had not been previously seen.

Yachts, opera, "cottages"
Unable to get an opera box at the Academy of Music, whose directors were loath to admit members of newly wealthy families into their circle, she was among those people instrumental in 1883 in founding the Metropolitan Opera, then based at the Metropolitan Opera House. The Metropolitan Opera long outlasted the Academy and continues to the present day.

In 1886, after her husband inherited $65 million from his father's estate, Alva set her sights on owning a yacht. William had the Alva commission by Harlan and Hollingsworth of Wilmington, Delaware, at a cost of $500,000. While J.P. Morgan's yacht Corsair was 165 feet long, Mrs. Astor's Nourmahal was 233 feet, and Alva's departed father-in-law's North Star measured 270 feet, Alva and William's 285-foot yacht was the largest private yacht in the world. The Vanderbilts then toured the Caribbean and Europe in the highest fashion.

This being done, Alva then wanted a "summer cottage" in fashionable Newport, Rhode Island. William commissioned Richard Morris Hunt again, and the elaborate Marble House was built next door to Mrs. Astor's Beechwood.

Alva's ostentatious displays of wealth helped to fuel American public interest in the lives of the rich and powerful, and, coupled with the opulent and decadent lifestyles by America's rich and their apparent disregard for the wellbeing of the working class, helped to also fuel fears that America had become a plutocracy.

Second marriage

Alva Vanderbilt shocked society in March 1895 when she divorced her husband who had long been unfaithful, at a time when divorce was rare among the elite, and received a large financial settlement said to be in excess of $10 million, in addition to several estates. She already owned Marble House outright. The grounds for divorce were allegations of William's adultery, although there were some who believed that William had hired a woman to pretend to be his seen mistress so that Alva would divorce him.

Alva remarried on January 11, 1896, to Oliver Hazard Perry Belmont, one of her ex-husband's old friends.  Oliver had been a friend of the Vanderbilts since the late 1880s and like William was a great fan of yachting and horseraces. He had accompanied them on at least two long voyages aboard their yacht the Alva.  Scholars have written that it seems to have been obvious to many that he and Alva were attracted to one another upon their return from one such voyage in 1889. He was the son of August Belmont, a successful Jewish investment banker for the Rothschild family, and Caroline Perry, the daughter of Commodore Matthew Calbraith Perry.  Upon Oliver's sudden death in 1908, Alva took on the new cause of the women's suffrage movement after hearing a lecture by Ida Husted Harper.

Women's suffrage 

Drawn further into the suffrage movement by Anna Shaw, Belmont donated large sums to the movement, both in the United Kingdom and United States. In 1909, she founded the Political Equality League to get votes for suffrage-supporting New York State politicians, and wrote articles for newspapers. She gave strong support to labor in the 1909-1910 New York shirtwaist makers strike. She paid the bail of picketers who had been arrested and funded a large rally in the city's Hippodrome, which she addressed along with Shaw, president of the National American Woman Suffrage Association (NAWSA). In 1909 she joined this organization and was named an alternate delegate from New York to the International Women's Suffrage Association meeting in London. There Belmont observed the commitment of Emmeline Pankhurst and her followers, who would influence the depth and the form of her own personal commitment to the cause. On her return to the United States, she paid for office space on Fifth Avenue that allowed the relocation of NAWSA offices to New York, and she funded its National Press Bureau. At the same time, she formed her own Political Equality League to seek broad support for suffrage in neighborhoods throughout the city, and, as its president, led its division of New York City's 1912 Women's Votes Parade.

By this time, organized suffrage activity was centered on educated, middle-class white women, who were often reluctant to accept immigrants, African Americans, and the working class into their ranks. Belmont's efforts only partially broke with this tradition. In 1910, Belmont initiated the first attempt to integrate the enfranchisement movement in New York. Working with leading clubwomen in the African American community, like S. J. S. Garnet, F. R. Keyser, Marie C. Lawton and Irene Moorman, she encouraged them to form a Black branch of her Political Equality League. She established its first "suffrage settlement house" in Harlem, and she included African American women and immigrants in weekend retreats at Beacon Towers, her Gothic style castle in Sands Point. However, she also contributed to the Southern Woman Suffrage Conference, which refused to admit African Americans.

The Congressional Union for Woman Suffrage (CU), originally led by Alice Paul and Lucy Burns, separated from the NAWSA in 1913. At the same time, Belmont was funding Laura Clay's Southern States Woman's Suffrage Conference in Kentucky, because of her Alabama roots. Belmont then merged the Political Equality League into the CU. Now committed to securing the passage of the 19th Amendment, she convened a "Conference of Great Women" at Marble House in the summer of 1914. Belmont's daughter Consuelo, who promoted suffrage and prison reform in England, addressed the gathering, which was followed by the CU's first national meeting. Belmont served on the executive committee of the CU from 1914 to 1916.

In 1915, Belmont chaired the women voters' convention at the Panama-Pacific International Exposition. The following year, she and Paul established the National Woman's Party from the membership of the CU and organized the first picketing ever to take place before the White House, in January 1917. She was elected president of the National Woman's Party, an office she held until her death. The National Woman's Party continued to lobby for new initiatives from the Washington, D.C., headquarters that Belmont had purchased in 1929 for the group, which became the Sewall–Belmont House and Museum. On April 12, 2016, President Barack Obama designated Sewall–Belmont House as the Belmont–Paul Women's Equality National Monument, named for Belmont and Alice Paul.

Later life and death 
From the early 1920s onward, she lived in France most of the time to be near her daughter Consuelo. She restored the 16th century Château d'Augerville and used it as a residence.  With Paul, she formed the International Advisory Council of the National Woman's Party and the Auxiliary of American Women abroad. She suffered a stroke in the spring of 1932 that left her partially paralyzed, and she died in Paris of bronchial and heart ailments on January 26, 1933. Her funeral at Saint Thomas Episcopal Church in New York City featured all female pallbearers and a large contingent of suffragists.  She is interred with Oliver Belmont in the Belmont Mausoleum at Woodlawn Cemetery in The Bronx, New York, for which artist Helen Maitland Armstrong designed a set of Renaissance-inspired painted glass windows.

Building programs

During Alva Belmont's lifetime she built, helped design, and owned many mansions. At one point she owned nine. She was a friend and frequent patron of Richard Morris Hunt and was one of the first female members of the American Institute of Architects.  Following the death of Hunt, she frequently utilized the services of the architectural firm of Hunt & Hunt, formed by the partnership of Richard Morris Hunt's sons, Richard and Joseph.

Petit Chateau

As a young newlywed, Alva Vanderbilt worked from 1878 to 1882 with Richard Morris Hunt to design a French Renaissance style chateau, known as the Petit Chateau, for her family at 660 Fifth Avenue in Manhattan. A contemporary of Vanderbilt's was quoted as saying that "she loved nothing better than to be knee deep in mortar."  She held a costume ball that cost $3 million to open the Fifth Avenue château.  It was demolished in 1929.

Marble House

In 1878, Hunt began work on their Queen Anne style retreat on Long Island, Idle Hour.  It would be added to almost continuously until 1889 and burned in 1899.  William K. Vanderbilt had a new fireproof mansion rebuilt on the estate and it later became the home of now closed Dowling College.

Hunt was again hired to design the neoclassical style Marble House in Newport, Rhode Island, as William K. Vanderbilt's 39th birthday present and summer "cottage" retreat for Alva.  Built from 1888 to 1892, the house was a social landmark that helped spark the transformation of Newport from a relatively relaxed summer colony of wooden houses to the now legendary resort of opulent stone palaces. It was reported to cost $11 million.  Marble House was staffed with 36 servants, including butlers, maids, coachmen, and footmen.  It was built next door to Caroline Astor's much simpler Beechwood estate.

Belcourt

After her divorce from Vanderbilt and subsequent remarriage to Oliver Belmont, she began extensive renovations to Belmont's sixty-room Newport mansion, Belcourt.  The entire first floor was composed of carriage space and a multitude of stables for Belmont's prized horses.  Eager to reshape and redesign Belcourt, Alva made changes that transformed the interiors of the mansion into a blend of French and English Gothic and Renaissance styles.

477 Madison Avenue

In 1899 she and Oliver bought the corner of 477 Madison Avenue and 51st Street in Manhattan.  The mansion became known as the Mrs. O. H. P. Belmont House. The neoclassical three-story townhouse, designed by Hunt & Hunt, had a limestone facade and interior rooms in an eclectic mix of styles. Construction was still underway when Oliver Belmont died, when Alva announced that she would build an addition that was an exact reproduction of the Gothic Room in Belcourt, to house her late husband's collection of medieval and early Renaissance armor. The room, dubbed The Armory, measured  and was the largest room in the house. She and her youngest son, Harold, moved into the house in 1909.  The Armory would later be used as a lecture hall for women suffragists.  She sold the townhouse in 1923.

Brookholt

Prior to the construction of their new Manhattan mansion, the Belmonts had another neoclassical mansion, Brookholt, built in 1897 in East Meadow on Long Island. It was designed by Hunt & Hunt.  Oliver Belmont died there in 1908.  For a short period, she operated the estate as Brookholt School of Agriculture for Women, a training school for female farmers.  She sold Brookholt in 1915.  The house was later destroyed by fire in 1934.

Mausoleum
Following Oliver Belmont's death, Belmont commissioned a family mausoleum to be built in Woodlawn Cemetery.  Again designed by Hunt & Hunt, it was an exacting replica of the original Chapel of Saint Hubert on the grounds of the Château d'Amboise.  It took several years, but construction was completed in 1913.

Beacon Towers

Belmont's last new mansion in the United States was built on Long Island's North Shore.  This one, Beacon Towers, has been described by scholars as a pure Gothic fantasy.  It was also designed by Hunt & Hunt and was built from 1917 to 1918 in Sands Point.  In 1925 Belmont closed the castle permanently; it was sold to William Randolph Hearst in 1927. He partially remodeled it and then sold it in 1942. It was demolished in 1945.  It is thought by some literary scholars to have been part of the inspiration for the home of Jay Gatsby in F. Scott Fitzgerald's The Great Gatsby.

Château d'Augerville

Belmont retired to France in 1923.  She had a townhouse in Paris and a villa on the Riviera. She also purchased the 15th-century Château d'Augerville in Augerville-la-Rivière, Loiret, in the summer of 1926 and restored it as her primary residence.  It had been one of the inspirations for her châteauesque-style 660 Fifth Avenue house and legend had it that the chateau had once belonged to Jacques Cœur, who had left it to his daughter.  Her daughter, Consuelo, wrote that she thought these two things had inspired her mother to buy the estate.

Belmont did a great deal of restoration and renovation during her ownership.  She had the river flowing through the estate widened because she said, as Consuelo later wrote, "This river is not wide enough."  She brought in paving stones from Versailles to cover the previously sand-paved great forecourt between the house and the village.  She also built a massive neo-Gothic portal gate on the northern entrance road, separating the château and village from the surrounding farmland.  Other changes included replacement of the wrought iron staircases and moving the kitchens to the basement.  She also added a bowling alley in one of the houses on the estate.  After her death in 1933, the chateau was left to Consuelo, who sold it to a Swiss company in the winter of 1937.

References

General bibliography 
 Lasch, Christopher. "Alva Erskine Smith Vanderbilt Belmont," in Edward James, ed., Notable American Women (1971)
 The Vanderbilt Women: Dynasty of Wealth, Glamour and Tragedy Clarice Stasz. New York, St. Martin's Press, 1991; iUniverse, 2000.
 Fortune's Children: The Fall of the House of Vanderbilt Arthur T Vanderbilt. Morrow, 1989.
 Consuelo and Alva Vanderbilt: The Story of a Daughter and a Mother in the Gilded Age. Amanda Mackenzie Stuart. New York: Harper Collins, 2005.
 The Barons of Newport: A Guide to the Gilded Age. Terrence Gavan. Newport: Pineapple Publications, 1998.

External links

 Long Island's Rebels With a Cause from New York Newsday
 Women in Philanthropy
 75 Suffragists
 

1853 births
1933 deaths
Activists from Alabama
American feminists
American socialites
American suffragists
Alva 1853
Burials at Woodlawn Cemetery (Bronx, New York)
Gilded Age
National Woman's Party activists
People from East Meadow, New York
People from Mobile, Alabama
Progressive Era in the United States
Alva Belmont
People from Midtown Manhattan